The Three Physicists Prize is a physics prize awarded by the École Normale Supérieure (ENS) in Paris and the Eugène Bloch Foundation. It is named in honour of the physicists Henri Abraham, Eugene Bloch and Georges Bruhat, who were successive directors of the physics laboratory at the ENS and all of whom were murdered in Nazi concentration camps between 1943 and 1945. The prize was established by Bloch's widow.

Winners 

 1951 Jean Cabannes
 1952 Maurice Bayen
 1953 Gustave Ribaud
 1954 Maurice Ponte
 1955 not awarded
 1956 Nevill Francis Mott
 1957 H. B. G. Casimir
 1958 J. Robert Oppenheimer
 1959 André Danjon
 1960 Gaston Dupouy
 1961 Max Morand
 1962 Jean Weigle
 1963 Louis Néel
 1964 André Lallemand
 1965 Alfred Kastler
 1966 Francis Perrin
 1967 Pierre Auger
 1968 Jean-François Denisse
 1969 Jean-Claude Pecker
 1970 Albert Kirrmann
 1971 Jean Coulomb
 1972 André Guinier
 1973 Pierre Grivet
 1974 Jean Rösch
 1975 Jean Brossel
 1976 Pierre Jacquinot
 1977 André Maréchal
 1978 Marcel Rouault
 1979 Michel Soutif
 1980 Robert Klapisch
 1981 Évry Schatzman
 1982 Philippe Nozières
 1983 Bernard Cagnac
 1984 Raimond Castaing
 1985 Sylvain Libermann
 1986 Claude Cohen-Tannoudji
 1987 Jacques Friedel
 1988 Philippe Meyer
 1989 Édouard Brézin
 1990 Claude Bouchiat
 1991 Julien Bok
 1992 Michel Davier
 1993 Jean-Louis Steinberg
 1994 Jacques Dupont-Roc
 1995 Bernard Jancovici
 1996 Jean-Claude Le Guillou
 1997 Claire Lhuillier
 1998 Albert Libchaber
 1999 Claudette Rigaux
 2000 Franck Laloë
 2001 Gérald Bastard
 2002 Walter Kohn
 2003 Pierre Encrenaz
 2004 Christophe Salomon
 2005 André Neveu
 2006 Yves Couder
 2007 Sébastien Balibar
 2008 Stéphan Fauve
 2009 Jean-Loup Puget
 2010 Jean Dalibard
 2011 Giorgio Parisi
 2012 Françoise Combes
 2013 Jean Iliopoulos
 2014 François Biraben
 2015 Bernard Derrida
 2016 Vincent Croquette
 2017 Michel Brune
 2018 Edith Falgarone
 2019 Vincent Hakim 
 2020 Bernard Placais
 2021 Marc Mézard

See also

 List of physics awards

References 

Physics awards
French science and technology awards